Nuestro was the first nationally published, monthly, general-interest magazine, in English, for and about Latinos in the United States. It was a landmark in publishing history in this country. Up until this time only "special interest" magazines for Latinos existed and were printed in Spanish. Latinos were an untapped and highly lucrative market for which census statistics showed that 76 percent of the Latino population was either bilingual or monolingual in English. This is from the New York Times article written by Philip H. Dougherty, Feb. 22, 1977 (See citation below): "Unlike all the other publications aimed at this market (estimated at from 2.6 million to 3.2 million households with an annual income of some $30 billion) Nuestro will be virtually entirely in English except for a brief Spanish synopsis preceding major features."

Nuestro means "Ours" in Spanish.  It was conceived by Daniel Lopez, 36, a businessman. In 1972 he started a company (corporation) in Washington called Nuestro Grafico Inc., with $650 in seed money ($500 of which came from Joan Gramatte, co-owner and art director, and $150 came from Lopez).

History 

The first issue was published in April 1977, with a 200,000 print run. It was both a subscription and newsstand publication. The magazine was written in English, with some Spanish information for major features in the magazine. Lopez chose to print in English instead of Spanish because he felt that younger Latinos speak English more often. He also marketed the magazine as the first for Latinos in English. Primary offices were in midtown Manhattan.

With Lopez as publisher, the editorial department was headed by Editor-in-Chief Charles Rivera, co-managing editors, José M. Ferrer III and Philip Herrera, both of whom were formerly associate editors at Time, Art Director and co-founder, Joan Gramatte; along with Senior Editor, Dolores Prida.

References

Citations

Sources 
 
 "The Press: New Voice for Latinos." Time. Monday April 18, 1977.

Monthly magazines published in the United States
Cultural magazines published in the United States
Defunct magazines published in the United States
Hispanic and Latino American culture
Latin American culture
Magazines established in 1977
Magazines disestablished in 1980